Keum-boo (also Geumbu, Kum-Boo or Kum-bu—Korean "attached gold") is an ancient Korean gilding technique used to apply thin sheets of gold to silver, to make silver-gilt. Traditionally, this technique is accomplished by first depleting a surface of sterling silver to bring up a thin layer of fine silver. Then 24 carat gold foil is applied with heat and pressure—mechanical gilding—to produce a permanent diffusion bond. 

Pure precious metals such as gold and silver have a very similar atomic structure and therefore have a good potential for bonding. Heating these metals to a temperature between 260–370°C increases the movement of the atoms. When pressure is added, this causes an electron exchange at the surface between the two metals, creating a permanent diffusion bond. This diffusion bond occurs far below the soldering temperature for either metal (Dhein, 2004).

Examples of this technique have probably been observed, but not positively identified on pieces from the second half of the first millennium B.C. and from the early first millennium A.D. (Oddy, 1981).

This technique is used in many cultures, including Chinese, Japanese and in the West to bond gold to other metals, including iron, copper, aluminum, gold alloys, white gold, palladium and platinum. Foil made from gold alloys can be applied to silver and other metals by first depletion gilding the surface of the foil (Lewton-Brain, 1987–1993).

See also
 Art movement
 Creativity techniques
 List of art media
 List of artistic media
 List of art movements
 List of most expensive paintings
 List of most expensive sculptures
 List of art techniques
 List of sculptors

References
Dhein, Christine (2004). "Keum-Boo Pillow Pendant"
Oddy, Andrew (1981). "Gilding Through the Ages"
Lewton-Brain, Charles (1987–1993). "Keum-Boo"
Korean Kum-Boo Metalwork, Traditional Arts Program Notes, 1998, Department of Anthropology, California Academy of Sciences.

Artistic techniques
Gold
Metal plating
Korean art